Hong Kong International Airport  is a major international airport and the primary airport serving the Hong Kong. It is built on reclaimed land on the island of Chek Lap Kok, Hong Kong. The airport is also referred to as Chek Lap Kok International Airport or Chek Lap Kok Airport, to distinguish it from its predecessor, the former Kai Tak International Airport.

Having been in commercial operation since 1998, Hong Kong International Airport is one of the largest trans-shipment centres, passenger hubs and gateways for destinations in greater China, Asia and the world. The airport is the world's busiest cargo gateway and one of the world's busiest passenger airports. It is also home to one of the world's largest passenger terminal buildings (the largest when opened in 1998).

The airport is operated by the Airport Authority Hong Kong (AAHH), which was established on 1 December 1995, 24 hours a day and is the primary hub for Cathay Pacific (the flag carrier of Hong Kong), Greater Bay Airlines, Hong Kong Airlines, HK Express and Air Hong Kong (cargo carrier). The airport is one of the hubs of Oneworld alliance, and also one of the Asia-Pacific cargo hubs for UPS Airlines. It is a focus city for China Airlines and China Eastern Airlines. Ethiopian Airlines utilise Hong Kong as a stopover point for their flights.

HKIA is an important contributor to Hong Kong's economy, with approximately 65,000 employees. More than 100 airlines operate flights from the airport to over 180 cities across the globe. In 2015, HKIA handled 68.5 million passengers, making it the 8th busiest airport worldwide by passenger traffic and the 4th busiest airport worldwide by international passenger traffic. Since 2010, it has also surpassed Memphis International Airport to become the world's busiest airport by cargo traffic (except in 2020 due to the COVID-19 pandemic). 

To facilitate the increased traffic due to the third runway, Terminal 2 has been undergoing redevelopment since 2019 and will not reopen until at least 2024. The Center Runway has also been closed for upgrades and also will not reopen until at least the end of 2023.

History

Chek Lap Kok Airport was designed as a replacement for the former Hong Kong International Airport (commonly known as Kai Tak Airport) built in 1925. Located in the densely built-up Kowloon City District with a single runway extending into Kowloon Bay, Hong Kong airport had turned on the runway lights for expansion to cope with steadily increasing air traffic. By the 1990s, Kai Tak had become one of the world's busiest airports – it far exceeded its annual passenger and cargo design capacities, and one out of every three flights experienced delays, largely due to lack of space for aircraft, gates, and a second runway. In addition, noise mitigation measures restricted nighttime flights, as severe noise pollution (exceeding 105 dB(A) in Kowloon City) adversely affected an estimated total of at least 340,000 people.

A 1974 planning study by the Civil Aviation and Public Works departments identified the small island of Chek Lap Kok, off Lantau Island, as a possible future airport replacement site. Far away from the congested city centre, flight paths would be routed over the South China Sea rather than populous urban areas, enabling efficient round-the-clock operation of multiple runways. The Chek Lap Kok (CLK) airport master plan and civil engineering studies were completed towards the end of 1982 and 1983 respectively. In February 1983, however, the government shelved the project for financial and economic reasons. In 1988, the Port & Airport Development Strategy (PADS) Study was undertaken by consultants, headed by Mott MacDonald Hong Kong Limited, reporting in December 1989. This study looked at forecasts for both airport and port traffic to the year 2011 and came up with three recommended strategies for overall strategic development in Hong Kong. One of the three assumed maintaining the existing airport at Kai Tak; a second assumed a possible airport in the Western Harbour between Lantau Island and Hong Kong Island, and the third assumed a new airport at Chek Lap Kok. The consultants produced detailed analyses for each scenario, enabling Government to consider these appraisals for each of the three "Recommended Strategies". In October 1989, the Governor of Hong Kong announced to the Legislative Council that a decision had been made on the long-term port and airport development strategy for the territory. The strategy to be adopted was that which included a replacement airport at Chek Lap Kok and incorporating new container terminals 8 and 9 at Stonecutters Island and east of the island of Tsing Yi respectively.

In the PADS study, the consultants advised that the earliest the airport could be opened was January 1998. However, in reaching the government's decision, this date was modified to January 1997, six months prior to the handover of Hong Kong to China. Construction of the new airport began in 1991. As construction progressed, an agreement was reached with China that as much as possible of the airport would be completed before the handover to China in July 1997. In the event, British Prime Minister John Major opened the Tsing Ma Bridge, the main access to Lantau Island and the airport and its supporting community in May 1997, prior to the transfer of sovereignty to China. The airport itself was opened in July 1998.

The construction period was very rushed; specialists considered that only a 10–20-year period was sufficient for this massive project.  Another cause for this rush was due to the uncertain future of the airport construction after the transfer of sovereignty over Hong Kong to the People's Republic of China. Shortly after the then-British colonial government of Hong Kong announced plans to construct the new airport, the Chinese government in Beijing began voicing objections to various aspects of the massive project, which prompted financial institutions to delay extending project finance. Without access to this financing, many of the companies who had secured contracts to build various portions of the project halted construction, resulting in delays that pushed the actual opening of the airport, originally planned to take place before the transition in sovereignty until one year after. As agreements were reached with the government in China, Beijing removed most of its objections and work then continued, albeit behind schedule.

Hong Kong International Airport was built on a large artificial island formed by flattening and levelling the former Chek Lap Kok and Lam Chau islands ( and  respectively) and reclaiming  of the adjacent seabed. The  airport site, with its reclamation, added nearly 1% to Hong Kong's total surface area, connecting to the north side of Lantau Island near Tung Chung new town.

Construction of the new airport was only part of the Airport Core Programme, which also involved the construction of new roads and rail links to the airport, with associated bridges and tunnels, and major land reclamation projects on both Hong Kong Island and in Kowloon. The project holds the record for the most expensive airport project ever, according to Guinness World Records. Construction of the new airport was also voted as one of the Top 10 Construction Achievements of the 20th Century at the ConExpo conference in 1999.

The detailed design for the airport terminal was awarded to a consortium led by Mott Connell (the Hong Kong office of UK consultant Mott MacDonald) with British Airports Authority as specialist designers for airport related aspects, Foster and Partners as architects and Ove Arup as specialist structural designers for the roof. Mott Connell were the designers for foundations, all other structural components and the mechanical and electrical work. The sides of the terminals, predominantly glass, were designed to break during high-speed winds, relieving pressure and allowing the terminal to withstand an intense typhoon.

The airport was officially opened in an opening ceremony by the President of the People's Republic of China and General Secretary of the Communist Party Jiang Zemin at noon Hong Kong Time on 2 July 1998. Hours later, Air Force One, carrying the President of the United States Bill Clinton, landed at the new airport and became the first foreign visitor to arrive at the new airport. The actual operation of the airport commenced on 6 July 1998, concluding the six-year construction that cost US$20 billion. On that day at 06:25 Hong Kong Time, Cathay Pacific Flight CX 889 from New York JFK Airport became the first commercial flight to land at the airport, pipping the original CX 292 from Rome which was the scheduled first arrival. However, the airport had already started to experience some technical difficulties on the first day of opening. The flight information display system (FIDS) had suddenly shut down which caused long delays. Shortly afterwards, the cargo-communication link with Kai Tak, where all the necessary data was stored (some still stored there then), went down. During the same period of time, someone had accidentally deleted an important database for cargo services. This meant that cargo had to be manually stored. At one point, the airport had to turn away all air cargo and freight headed for and exported from Hong Kong (except food and medical supplies) while it sorted out the huge mess. HKIA simply could not keep up without an automated assistant-computer system. For three to five months after its opening, it suffered various severe organisational, mechanical and technical problems that almost crippled the airport and its operations. Computer glitches were mostly to blame for the major crisis. Lau Kong-wah, a Hong Kong politician, was quoted saying "This was meant to be a first-class project, but it has turned into a ninth-class airport and a disgrace. Our airport has become the laughing stock of the world." At one time, the government reopened the cargo terminal at Kai Tak Airport to handle freight traffic because of a breakdown at the new cargo terminal, named Super Terminal One (ST1). However, after six months the airport started to operate normally.

On 31 July 2000, Todd Salimuchai, a regularised illegal immigrant in Hong Kong with no provable nationality, forced his way through a security checkpoint using a fake pistol, took a woman hostage, and boarded a Cathay Pacific aircraft. He demanded to be flown to Burma, which he claimed was his native country but had refused to admit him due to his lack of documents. He surrendered to police two and a half hours later.

Officially opened in June 2007, the second airport terminal, called T2, (check-in facility only) is linked with the MTR Airport Express on a new platform. The terminal also features a new shopping mall, SkyPlaza, providing a large variety of shops and restaurants, together with a few entertainment facilities. T2 also houses a 36-bay coach-station for buses to and from mainland China and 56 airline check-in counters, as well as customs and immigration facilities.

Besides T2, the SkyCity Nine Eagles Golf Course has been opened in 2007 whereas the second airport hotel, the Hong Kong SkyCity Marriott Hotel; and a permanent cross-boundary ferry terminal, the Skypier, began operations in 2008 and 2009 respectively. Development around T2 also includes the AsiaWorld-Expo which has started operation in late 2005. A second passenger concourse, the North Satellite Concourse (NSC), opened in 2010, followed by the Midfield Concourse in December 2015.

During August 2019, the airport was shut down multiple times as demonstrations were held inside the airport during the 2019–20 Hong Kong protests, over 160 flights were cancelled as both the arrivals and departures sections of the airport were occupied.

The third runway, known as the North Runway, opened in 2021, the first part of the Hong Kong International Airport Master Plan 2030 to open. The Center runway was then closed to facilitate construction works and upgrades.

Composition

The airport has a total of 90 boarding gates, with 77 jet bridge gates (1–21, 23–36, 40–50, 60–71, 201–219) and 12 virtual gates (228–230, 511–513, 520–525) which are used as assembly points for passengers, who are then ferried to the aircraft by apron buses. Of the 66 jet bridges, five (Gates 5, 23, 60, 62, 64) are capable of handling the Airbus A380, the current users of which are Asiana Airlines, British Airways, Emirates, Qantas and Singapore Airlines. Korean Air and China Southern Airlines previously operated a route to HKIA from Seoul and Beijing respectively using the Airbus A380, but these airlines decided to not use them due to unprofitable nature of the aircraft type. Air France, Lufthansa and Thai Airways International previously operated services to Hong Kong from Paris, Frankfurt and Bangkok using the Airbus A380, though they retired the aircraft types early due to the COVID-19 pandemic.

In addition to Chek Lap Kok, the airport occupies what was Lam Chau.

Terminal 1

Terminal 1's title as the world's largest was surrendered to Beijing Capital International Airport Terminal 3 on 29 February 2008.

Starting from late 2021, the air side of Hong Kong airport Terminal 1 start segregating Mainland Chinese flights and other international flights into two separate zones, "Green zone" and "Orange zone", for the purpose of reducing the risk of cross infection of novel coronavirus between travellers and airport workers serving different destinations.

In November 2022, the Sky Bridge opened as part of a wider HK$9 billion airport upgrade, connecting Terminal 1 to the North Satellite Concourse (NSC). Lined with glass floor panels at the edges, the 200 metre long, 28 metre high bridge, the largest of its kind, is high enough for an Airbus A380 to pass underneath.

Terminal 2

It was only a check-in and processing facility for departing passengers with no gates or arrival facilities (passengers were transported underground to gates at Terminal 1). The SkyPlaza was situated within Terminal 2. Terminal 2 was temporarily closed in November 2019 for expansion to provide departure and arrival facilities for the new satellite terminal from the three-runway system. Before its temporary closure most low-cost carriers and some full-service carriers had relocated their check-in operations to T2.

T1 Satellite Concourse

In 2007, HKIA began the construction of a two-storey T1 Satellite Concourse (T1S), previously known as the North Satellite Concourse, which opened in December 2009. This concourse was designed for narrow-body aircraft and is equipped with 10 jet bridges. T1S was built so the airport could accommodate at least 90 percent of its passengers by aerobridges. It has two levels (one for departures and one for arrivals). A new Sky Bridge connecting Terminal 1 and T1S opened in November 2022, allowing passengers to walk above taxiing planes, saving time from taking the airport shuttle bus.

Midfield Concourse

On 25 January 2011, Airport Authority Hong Kong (AA) unveiled phase 1 of its midfield development project which was targeted for completion by the end of 2015. The midfield area is located to the west of Terminal 1 between the two existing runways. It was the then last piece of land on the airport island available for large-scale development. This includes 20 aircraft parking stands, three of these are wide enough to serve the Airbus A380 and cater for an additional 10 million passengers annually. Passengers reach the concourse through an extension of the underground automated people mover. A joint venture of Mott MacDonald and Arup led the design of the project. Gammon Construction undertook the construction work. The Concourse began operations on 28 December 2015, and the first flight that used it was the HX658 operated by the Hong Kong Airlines flying from Hong Kong to Okinawa. On 31 March 2016, the Concourse was officially inaugurated in a ceremony marking its full commissioning.

Other buildings

Cathay Pacific City, the head office of Cathay Pacific and Air Hong Kong, is located on the airport island. CNAC House, the office for Air China is also located in the airport complex, together with the Civil Aviation Department headquarters. HAECO also has its head office on the airport property. HK Express has its head office on the airport property, in what was previously the Dragonair House, head office of Cathay Dragon.

The Government Flying Service (GFS) has its head office building in the airport. Additionally the head office of the Air Accident Investigation Authority (AAIA) is in the Facility Building on the airport property.

Airport expansion projects 
In June 2010, the Airport Authority unveiled plans to develop in stages the vast midfield site of the airport island. Stage 1 will involve the construction of a new 20-gate passenger concourse to be built in 2 phases (completion 2015 and 2020) with 11 gates in phase 1 growing to 20 gates in phase 2. The configuration of the new concourse is similar to those at Atlanta, Bangkok–Suvarnabhumi, Berlin (Terminal 1), Chicago–O'Hare (Global Terminal), Denver, Detroit (McNamara Terminal), London–Heathrow (Terminals 2 and 5), Los Angeles (TBIT), Munich (Terminal 2), Salt Lake City, Seoul–Incheon, Washington–Dulles and Felipe Ángeles International Airport (Zumpango). After stage 1 of midfield development is completed in 2020, there will be sufficient lands remaining for further new concourses to be built as and when demand for them materialises.

Master Plan 2030

One year after, on 2 June 2011, the Airport Authority announced and released their latest version of a 20-year blueprint for the airport's development, the Hong Kong International Airport Master Plan 2030. The study took three years and according to the authority, nine consulting organisations have been hired for the research, observation, planning and advice. The main focus is to improve the overall capacity and aircraft handling ability of the airport. Based on this, two options have been developed.

Option 1: Two-runway system
To maintain the current two-runway system, there will be enhancements to the terminal and apron facilities to increase the airport's capacity. This option will enable the airport to handle a maximum of 420,000 flight movements per year, with annual passenger and cargo throughput increased to 74 million and six million tonnes respectively. The approximate cost of this plan is $23.4 billion Hong Kong dollars in 2010 prices, or HK$42.5 billion in money-of-the-day prices. The Airport Authority estimates that the airport will reach its maximum runway capacity sometime around 2020 if no extra runway is added.

Option 2: Three-runway system

Associated facilities, additional terminals, airfield and apron facilities, will be built as well, and, combined with the new runway, it is estimated that the airport would be able to handle a maximum of 620,000 flights per year (102 per hour, or about one flight every 36 seconds), and meet forecast annual passenger and cargo throughput of about 97 million and 8.9 million tonnes by 2030 respectively.

There are possible drawbacks. Development costs are a concern: although the proposal would increase the number of direct jobs associated with HKIA to 150,000 by 2030 and generate an ENPV of HK$912 billion (in 2009 dollars), the estimated cost is approximately $86.2 billion (2010) Hong Kong Dollars, or HK$141.5 billion (at money-of-the-day prices). There are also environmental and local noise pollution concerns.

On 20 March 2012, the Hong Kong Government adopted this option as the official expansion plan.

The third runway, with its own dedicated passenger concourse (T2 Concourse), was built parallel to the current two runways on reclaimed land directly north of the existing airport island. The third runway (referred as the North runway) began operations in July 2022, while the original North runway (re-designated as the Centre runway) was closed for reconfiguration and is expected to be completed by 2024, alongside other facilities of the Three-runway system project including the T2 expansion, new T2 Concourse, automatic people mover, and baggage handling system.

Airlines and destinations

Passenger

Cargo

Statistics

Operations

The airport is operated by the Airport Authority Hong Kong, a statutory body wholly owned by the Government of Hong Kong Special Administrative Region.

The south runway has a Category II Precision Approach, while the centre runway has the higher Category IIIA rating, which allows pilots to land in only  visibility. The two runways have a capacity of over 60 aircraft movements an hour. The airport is upgrading ATC and runways so that they can handle 68 movements per hour. Normally, the centre runway (07C/25C; until 1 December 2021 the north runway 07L/25R) is used for landing passenger planes. The south runway (07R/25L) is used for passenger planes taking off and cargo flights due to its proximity to the cargo terminal. A third runway (designated 07L/25R) to their north has opened in mid-2022, while the Centre runway has been closed for upgrades. When all 3 runways are opened, it is estimated that the airport will be able to handle a maximum of 620,000 flights per year (102 per hour, or about one flight every 36 seconds).

There are 49 frontal stands at the main passenger concourse, 28 remote stands and 25 cargo stands. There are also five parking bays at the Northwest Concourse. A satellite concourse with 10 frontal stands for narrow body aircraft has been commissioned to the north of the main concourse at the end of 2009, bringing the total number of frontal stands at the airport to 59.

The airport was the busiest for passenger traffic in Asia in 2010, and the world's busiest airport for cargo traffic in 2010. In terms of international traffic, the airport is the third busiest for passenger traffic and the busiest for cargo since its operation in 1998. There are over 95 international airlines providing about 900 scheduled passenger and all-cargo flights each day between Hong Kong and some 160 destinations worldwide. About 76 percent of these flights are operated with wide-body jets. There is also an average of approximately 31 non-scheduled passenger and cargo flights each week.

The operation of scheduled air services to and from Hong Kong is facilitated by air services agreements between Hong Kong and other countries. Since the opening of HKIA, the Government of the Hong Kong Special Administrative Region has implemented a policy of progressive liberalisation of air services. Many low-cost airlines have started various regional routes to compete head-on with full-service carriers on trunk routes.

The airport's long term expansion opportunities are subject to variables. The airport opened its third runway in July 2022 as part of a HK$141.5 billion expansion project that would increase its land footprint by 50%. On the other hand, there exists only one airway between Hong Kong and mainland China, and this single route is often and easily backed up causing delays on both sides. In addition, China requires that aircraft flying the single air route between Hong Kong and the mainland must be at an altitude of at least 15,000 feet. Talks are underway to persuade the Chinese military to relax its airspace restriction in view of worsening air traffic congestion at the airport. Other than that, Hong Kong Airport Authority is co-operating with other airports in the area to relieve air traffic and in the future, Shenzhen may act as a regional airport while Hong Kong receives all the international flights.

Air traffic

The Government Flying Service provides short and long range search and rescue services, police support, medical evacuation and general purpose flights for the Government.

Passenger facilities

Despite its size, the passenger terminal was designed for convenience. The layout and signage, moving walkways and the automated people mover help passengers move through the building. The HKIA Automated People Mover, a driverless people mover system with 3 stations transports passengers between the check-in area and the gates. The airport also contains an IMAX theatre that has the largest screen in Hong Kong. The theatre is located in Terminal 2, level 6 and can seat 350 persons at a time.

Hong Kong Business Aviation Centre

The Hong Kong Business Aviation Centre (HKBAC) is located within the airport and has its own terminal and facilities separate from the public terminal. It provides services for executive aircraft and passengers, including a passenger lounge, private rooms and showers, business centre facilities, ground handling, baggage handling, fuelling, security, customs and flight planning. Designated spaces and hangars are also provided at the HKBAC for private aircraft. HKBAC has broken ground on a HK$400 million ($51 million) expansion. The project, which will double the airport's handling capacity for business jet movements, is expected to be completed in 2025.

Intermodal transportation hub

To sustain the growth of passengers, the Airport Authority formulated a "push and pull through" strategy to expand its connections to new sources of passengers and cargo. This means adapting the network to the rapidly growing markets in China and in particular to the Pearl River Delta region (PRD). In 2003, a new Airport-Mainland Coach Station opened. The coach station has a  waiting lounge and sheltered bays for ten coaches. Many buses operate each day to transport passengers between HKIA and major cities in the Mainland.

The Coach Station was relocated to the ground floor (level 3) of Terminal 2 in 2007. The 36 bays at the new Coach Station allow cross-border coaches to make 320 trips a day carrying passengers between the airport and 90 cities and towns in the PRD. Local tour and hotel coaches also operate from T2. The coach station at T2 has shops and waiting lounges as well as a mainland coach service centre which gathers all operators together.

In late September 2003, the SkyPier high-speed ferry terminal opened. Passengers arriving at the SkyPier board buses to the terminal and arriving air passengers board ferries at the pier for their ride back to the PRD. Passengers travelling both directions can bypass custom and immigration formalities, which reduces transit time. Four ports – Shekou, Shenzhen, Macau and Humen (Dongguan) – were initially served. As of August 2007, SkyPier serves Shenzhen's Shekou and Fuyong, Dongguan's Humen, Macau, Zhongshan and Zhuhai. Passengers travelling from Shekou and Macau can complete airline check-in procedures with participating airlines before boarding the ferries and go straight to the boarding gate for the flight at HKIA.

In 2009, the permanent SkyPier Terminal opened. The permanent ferry terminal is equipped with four berths, but the terminal is designed to accommodate eight berths. Transfer desks and baggage handling facilities are included, and the terminal is directly connected to the airport automatic people mover system.

Baggage and cargo facilities

Ramp handling services are provided by Hong Kong Airport Services Limited (HAS), Jardine Air Terminal Services Limited and SATS HK Limited. Their services include the handling of mail and passenger baggage, transportation of cargo, aerobridge operations and the operation of passenger stairways. The airport has an advanced baggage handling system (BHS), the main section of which is located in the basement level of the passenger terminal, and a separate remote transfer facility at the western end of the main concourse for the handling of tight connection transfer bags.

HKIA handles over five million tonnes of cargo annually. Hong Kong Air Cargo Terminals Limited operates one of the two air cargo terminals at the airport. Its headquarters, the  SuperTerminal 1, is the world's second largest stand-alone air cargo handling facility, after the opening of the West Cargo Handling Area of the Shanghai Pudong International Airport on 26 March 2008. The designed capacity is 2.6 million tonnes of freight a year. The second air cargo terminal is operated by Asia Airfreight Terminal Company Limited, and has a capacity of 1.5 million tonnes a year. DHL operates the DHL Central Asia Hub cargo facility which handles 35,000 parcels and 40,000 packages per hour. Hongkong Post operates the Air Mail Centre (AMC) and processes 700,000 packages per day. It is envisaged that HKIA's total air cargo capacity per annum will reach nine million tonnes ultimately.

Aircraft maintenance services

Both line and base maintenance services are undertaken by Hong Kong Aircraft Engineering Company (HAECO), while China Aircraft Services Limited (CASL) and Pan Asia Pacific Aviation Services Limited carry out line maintenance. Line maintenance services include routine servicing of aircraft performed during normal turnaround periods and regularly scheduled layover periods. Base maintenance covers all airframe maintenance services and for this HAECO has a three-bay hangar, which can accommodate up to three Boeing 747-400 aircraft and two Airbus A320 aircraft, and an adjoining support workshop.  HAECO also has the world's largest mobile hangar, weighing over 400 tons.  It can be used to enclose half of a wide-body aeroplane so that the whole facility can fully enclose four 747s when the mobile hangar is used.

On 29 May 2009, CASL opened its first aircraft maintenance hangar in the maintenance area of the airport. CASL specialises in Airbus A320 family and Boeing 737 Next Generation series heavy maintenance.

Airport based ground services

The Air Traffic Control Complex (ATCX), located at the centre of the airfield, is the nerve centre of the entire air traffic control system. Some 370 air traffic controllers and supporting staff work around the clock to provide air traffic control services for the Hong Kong Flight Information Region (FIR). At the Air Traffic Control Tower, controllers provide 24-hour aerodrome control services to aircraft operating at the airport. A backup Air Traffic Control Centre/Tower constructed to the north of the ATCX is available for operational use in the event normal services provided in the ATCX are disrupted by unforeseen circumstances. Apart from serving as an operational backup, the facilities are also used for air traffic control training.

The Airport Meteorological Office (AMO) of the Hong Kong Observatory (HKO) provides weather services for the aviation community. The AMO issues alerts of low-level windshear and turbulence. Windshear detection is made using traditional doppler weather radars as well as the more effective doppler LIDAR, of which Hong Kong International Airport was the first to introduce. Doppler LIDAR systems use lasers to detect windshear and wind direction even when atmospheric conditions are too dry for Doppler radar to work.

Fire and rescue services
Rescue and fire fighting services within the airport are covered by the Airport Fire Contingent of the Hong Kong Fire Services Department. The contingent has 282 members, operating three fire stations and two rescue berths for 24-hour emergency calls. It is equipped with 14 fire appliances which can respond to incidents within two minutes in optimum conditions of visibility and surface conditions, satisfying the relevant recommendation of the International Civil Aviation Organization. Two high capacity rescue boats, supported by eight speed boats, form the core of sea rescue operations. One ambulance is assigned at each of the airport fire stations.

Ground transport

The Airport is connected to inner Hong Kong by the Route 8 in Hong Kong North Lantau Highway on Lantau Island.

There is an automated people mover, operated by the Airport Authority and maintained by MTR Corporation, connecting the East Hall to the Midfield Concourse via West Hall and Terminal 2. It was extended to SkyPier in late 2009 and extended to Midfield Concourse in 2015.

Bus

Citybus (CityFlyer for Airport services), New Lantau Bus, Long Win Bus and Discovery Bay Transit Services (Permits required) operate more than 25 bus routes to the airport from various parts of Hong Kong, available at the Airport Ground Transportation Centre and Cheong Tat Road. The bus companies also offer 10 overnight "N" Bus lines (a.k.a. Night services).

Passengers can also take bus route number S1 to the Tung Chung MTR station. From there they can board the MTR Tung Chung line which follows the same route as the MTR Airport Express Line to Central Station with cheaper fare but longer journey time.

There is bus service to Hong Kong–Zhuhai–Macau Bridge Control Point. Which services between Chek Lap Kok, Hong Kong to Zhuhai, China and Macau. Coach services are also available to major cities and towns in Guangdong Province, China. such as Dongguan, Guangzhou and Shenzhen. And Also for HZMBus to Macau

Ferry

Direct ferry services are available from the airport to various destinations throughout the Pearl River Delta in China and Macau via Skypier. Passengers using these services are treated as transit passengers and are not considered to have entered Hong Kong for immigration purposes. For this reason, access to the ferry terminal is before immigration in the airport for arriving passengers. Check-in services are available at these piers. Four ports – Shekou, Shenzhen Airport (Fuyong) and Humen (Dongguan) in China, and Outer Harbour Ferry Terminal in Macau– were initially served, extending to Guangzhou and Zhongshan at the end of 2003. The Zhuhai service began on 10 July 2007 while a Nansha service started on 14 July 2009.

Rail

The fastest service from the city to the airport is the Airport Express, which was a part of the Hong Kong Rail Network in Hong Kong. A dedicated rapid-speed rail link as part of the MTR rapid transit network. The line serves between Asia-World-Expo and Hong Kong (Central) Station makes intermediate stops at the following stations:

 Tsing Yi Station (Located in the northeastern Part of Tsing Yi Island, Kwai Tsing District, Tsing Yi [which is one of three Communes which form the Tsuen Wan New Town {the other two are Tsuen Wan and Kwai Chung}], this station mostly served passengers from the western part of the New Territories. Transfers are available for the Tung Chung Line. Connections are also available for taxis and public/private buses at the local Maritime Square)
 Kowloon Station (Located in the Yau Tsim Mong District on the western part of the Kowloon Peninsula, this station is the major transfer hub in the Kowloon Peninsula, with stunning landmarks such as West Kowloon Cultural District, the M+ Art Museum, Hong Kong Palace Museum, Avenue of Stars and many more. Transfers are available for the Tung Chung Line [and Tuen Ma Line (Formerly called the West Rail Line) in Austin Station] for passengers for the East Kowloon and the New Territories. Since Autumn 2018, the High Speed Rail Network Line operates in West Kowloon Station which connects to the National Rail Network of China. Connections are also available for taxis, MTR Shuttle Buses and public/private buses at Elements. In-town check-in services for major airlines are provided.
 Hong Kong Station, the terminus, is located at the northern coast of Central and Western District on Hong Kong Island. It takes approximately 24 minutes to reach the airport from Hong Kong Station. Transfers are available for the Tung Chung Line (and Island Line and Tsuen Wan Line at Central Station, where travellators link the two stations.) Connections are also available such as free MTR shuttle bus services between Airport Express stations and hotels in the area, and free transfers to and from other MTR lines with a valid Octopus card (which is not available to Single Ride Ticket users). Hong Kong Station also provides in-town check-in services for major airlines. (Passengers can ride one stop of the Island Line or Tsuen Wan Line to Admiralty Station, where transfers are available for the South Island Line [Opened on December 28, 2016, located on Platforms 5 and 6 {towards South Horizons}] and the East Rail Line [Opened on May 15, 2022, located on Platforms 7 {towards Lo Wu and Lok Ma Chau Border Crossing Stations} and 8 {terminating platform}.])
 The Airport Express line originally terminated at Airport station, where trains open doors on both sides, allowing direct access to either Terminal 1 or Terminal 2. It was later extended to AsiaWorld–Expo station on 20 December 2005 to facilitate the opening of the nearby AsiaWorld–Expo. During events at the station some Tung Chung line trains, which largely share the same tracks as the Airport Express, serve this station instead of Tung Chung, but these trains do not stop by Airport station.

Taxi

The airport is served by all three different types of taxis, distinguished by their colour:
 Urban Taxis connect the Airport with Hong Kong Island, Kowloon Peninsula and parts of the new towns of Metropolitan Hong Kong such as Tsuen Wan, Sha Tin and Tseung Kwan O.(urban taxis can go anywhere in Hong Kong except southern parts of Lantau Island). Initial fare HK$27.00 (~US$3.44)
 New Territories Taxis connect the airport with the New Territories, except those parts in the Metropolitan Hong Kong Area such as Tsuen Wan, Sha Tin and Tseung Kwan O (except parts of Hang Hau) were served by urban taxis. Initial fare HK$23.50 (~US$2.99)
 Lantau Taxis connect the airport with the rest of Lantau Island. Initial fare HK$22.00 (~US$2.80)

Accidents and incidents

The following are aviation accidents or incidents at the current HKIA (see accidents and incidents at the former HKIA at Kai Tak):

On 22 August 1999, China Airlines Flight 642 (an MD-11 operated by subsidiary Mandarin Airlines), which was landing at Hong Kong International Airport during Typhoon Sam after a flight from Bangkok International Airport (now Bangkok Don Mueang International Airport), rolled over and caught fire, coming to rest upside down beside the runway. Of the 315 passengers and crew on board, 3 people were killed and 219 were injured.
 On 13 April 2010, Cathay Pacific Flight 780 from Surabaya Juanda International Airport to Hong Kong landed safely after both engines failed due to contaminated fuel. 57 passengers were injured. Its two pilots received the Polaris Award from the International Federation of Air Line Pilots' Associations for their heroism and airmanship.
 In 2015, a French traveler committed suicide by jumping to his death.
 On 4 October 2017, some cargo caught fire as it was being loaded onto an American Airlines plane. The authorities were able to contain the fire. The plane and an airport vehicle was damaged and one person was injured.
In April 2021, three cargo pallets waiting to be transferred onto a Hong Kong Air Cargo caught fire. Each pallet included Vivo smartphones destined for Bangkok. The airline banned shipments of Vivo phones and all shipments from two freight forwarding companies as a result.
On 21 July 2021, UPS Airlines Flight 5X003 suffered from an engine fire in the #1 engine shortly after take-off. The flight subsequently made a successful emergency landing on Runway 07L and was met by airport fire crews from the Hong Kong Fire Services Department Main Airport Station which extinguished the flames. Hong Kong Civil Aviation Department and the NTSB are currently investigating the incident.

Accolades
Skytrax World's Best Airport for Dining (2017)
AETRA Best Airport Worldwide (2005)
Air Cargo News Cargo Airport of the Year (2002–2003)
Air Cargo World Air Cargo Excellence (2007)
Air Transport Research Society Asia Pacific Airport Efficiency Excellence Award (2007)
Asiaweek Asia's Best Airport (2000)
British Constructional Steelwork Association, the Steel Construction Institute and British Steel plc Structural Steel Design Award (1999)
Business Traveller Best Airport in China (2006–2008, 2010–2014)
Centre for Asia Pacific Aviation CAPA International Airport of the Year (2007)
Conde Nast Traveller World's Best Airport (2007)
Construction Industry Manufacturers Association CONEXPO-CON/AGG '99 Top 10 Construction Achievements of the 20th Century – Airport Core Programme (1999)
Federation of Asia Pacific Aircargo Associations Most Friendly Airport for Cargo (2005)
Hong Kong Institute of Architects Silver Medal for Architecture (1999)
Hong Kong Institute of Certified Public Accountants Diamond – Best Corporate Governance Disclosure Awards (2004)
International Air Transport Association (IATA) Eagle Award (2002)
Payload Asia Awards Asia Pacific Airport of the Year – Industry Choice Award (2014–2015)
Raven Fox Award for Travel-Retail Excellence in Asia / Pacific (1999–2000)
Skytrax World's Best Airport (2001–2005, 2007–2008, 2011)
Smart Travel Asia World's Best Airport (2006–2007, 2011, 2014)
SmartTravelAsia.com Best Airport Worldwide (2006–2007)
TravelWeekly Best International Airport (2007)
TravelWeeklyChina Best Airport Facilities (2006)
TTG Best Airport (2002, 2004–2008; Survey was not held in 2003 owing to SARS)
WTA World Travel Awards Asia/ Pacific's Leading Airport (2000)

See also

Airport Freight Forwarding Centre
Airport Security Unit
Hong Kong–Zhuhai–Macau Bridge
List of busiest airports by cargo traffic
List of busiest airports by passenger traffic
List of places in Hong Kong
Megaprojects and Risk
Shek Kong Airfield – a military airbase in Hong Kong
Transport in Hong Kong
Tuen Mun–Chek Lap Kok Link

References

External links
 
 
 
 
 
 

 
Chek Lap Kok
Airports in Hong Kong
Airports established in 1998
Artificial island airports
Foster and Partners buildings
Lattice shell structures
Articles containing video clips
Neo-futurism architecture
1998 establishments in Hong Kong
Artificial islands of Hong Kong